The 2014–15 North Texas Mean Green women's basketball team represents the University of North Texas during the 2014–15 NCAA Division I women's basketball season. The Mean Green, led by third year head coach Mike Petersen, play their home games UNT Coliseum, also known as The Super Pit,  and are second year members of Conference USA. They finished the season 5–24, 4–14 in C-USA play to finish in a tie for twelfth place. They failed to qualify for the Conference USA women's tournament.

Roster

Schedule

|-
!colspan=9 style="background:#059033; color:#000000;"| Exhibition

|-
!colspan=9 style="background:#059033; color:#000000;"| Regular Season

See also
2014–15 North Texas Mean Green men's basketball team

References

North Texas Mean Green women's basketball seasons
North Texas Mean Green
North Texas
North Texas